Lessons in Love is a 1921 American silent romantic comedy film directed by Chester Withey.

Cast
 Constance Talmadge as
 Flora Finch
 James Harrison
 George Fawcett
 Kenneth Harlan
 Florence Short 
 Louise Lee 
 Frank Webster

References

External links

1921 films
American black-and-white films
1921 romantic comedy films
American romantic comedy films
Films directed by Chester Withey
American silent feature films
1920s American films
Silent romantic comedy films
Silent American comedy films
First National Pictures films